Aida, also spelled 'Ayda, is a Palestinian refugee camp situated  north of the historic centre of Bethlehem and  north of Beit Jala, in the central West Bank, State of Palestine.

According to the UNRWA, the camp had a population of approximately 5,498 refugees at the end of 2014.

History
Named after a famous coffeehouse (maqhah) located on the site in the early 1940s, Aida camp was established in 1950 by refugees from the Jerusalem and Hebron areas, and covered an area of 66 dunams (0.17 square kilometres). At the time, Aida housed 1125 refugees living in 94 tents.

The camp came under special hardship during the Second Intifada, when the school sustained severe damage and 29 housing units were destroyed by Israeli military incursions. The Israeli military placed the camp and surrounding areas under curfew, made arrests and even demolished walls between houses in order to bypass the roads in the camp. In one such maneuver, camp resident Huda Hawaja was mortally wounded when Israeli soldiers demolished her doors, and died after there were delays in calling an ambulance due to the military presence. The incident was documented by embedded journalists and broadcast on Channel 2, leading to a public outcry and backlash from the Israeli military against the press.

Pope Benedict XVI visited the refugee camp during his Middle East pilgrimage visit to Jordan, Israel and the Palestinian territories in May 2009. He said that the refugees lived in "precarious and difficult conditions" and that "It is tragic to see walls still being erected".

On 29 October 2015, at dusk, a video filmed on his iPhone by a resident of the Aida  Refugee Camp, Yazan Ikhlayel (17), captured a megaphone address made from an Israeli military vehicle during a raid into the camp. The speaker warned residents that if they threw stones at the car, "we will hit you with gas until you all die. The children, the youth and the old people, you will all die. We won’t leave any of you alive”.  “We have arrested one of you,” he continued; “He’s with us now. We took him from his home and we will slaughter and kill him while you watch if you keep throwing stones. Go home or we will gas you until you die. Your family, your children, everyone. We will kill you”. After the incident, the Israeli Border Police informed it had suspended the officer suspected in the incident, and would review his continued service in the force.

Today
Aida camp is adjacent to Rachel's Tomb, walled off from Jerusalem by the Israeli West Bank barrier and contiguous to the Israeli settlement of Gilo. The Aida Refugee camp is adjacent to a new 4-star hotel, the Intercontinental, on the Jerusalem-Hebron road. On the camp's entrance gate a huge "key of return" is pictured, and on the separation barrier a large graffiti has been painted with the words Gernika [Guernica] 1936 – Palestina 1948.

The camp contains two schools and no health clinics, although UNRWA has provided assistance for physicians and physiotherapists to provide medical assistance within the camp. Access to water is often disrupted for Aida's residents, and sewerage is poor. The unemployment rate in Aida stands at 43%.

Aida is the location of the Al Rowwad Cultural and Theatre Training Center and the Lajee Youth Center, both of which practice cultural and creative forms of resistance. Refugees in Aida camp have practiced predominantly non-violent opposition to the Israeli occupation. The situation for youth in Aida camp was publicised in Flying Home, an illustrated children's book produced by Lajee in 2009.

References

See also
Welcome To 'Ayda R.C.
 ‘Ayda Camp Profile, Applied Research Institute–Jerusalem, ARIJ
  ‘Ayda Arial Photo, ARIJ
Aida refugee camp, UNWRA
The priorities and needs for development in ‘Ayda camp based on the community and local authorities’ assessment, ARIJ

Populated places established in 1950
Bethlehem
Bethlehem Governorate
Palestinian refugee camps in the West Bank